The Transport Museum, Wythall is a transport museum just outside Birmingham, at Chapel Lane, Wythall, Worcestershire, England. The museum was originally run by the charity The Birmingham and Midland Motor Omnibus Trust (BaMMOT).

BaMMOT was formed in 1977 and the museum site was acquired in February 1978. The museum has three halls, presenting a significant collection of preserved buses and coaches, including Midland Red and Birmingham City Transport vehicles, a collection of battery electric vehicles such as milk floats, and a Tilling-Stevens petrol-electric bus.

In 2016 the Trust became a CIO charity called Transport Museum Wythall (TMW), registered number 1167872

It is also home to the Elmdon Model Engineering Society (EMES) who operate the Wythall miniature railway within the grounds of the transport museum, giving rides to public on miniature steam trains.

References

External links
 Official website
 
 http://www.wythallsteamrail.com - Wythall miniature railway's website.

Transport in Birmingham, West Midlands
Transport museums in England
Museums in Worcestershire
Charities based in Worcestershire